Khadijah Ameenah Whittington (born August 5, 1986) is an American professional basketball player for the CSM Satu Mare of the Liga Națională. After graduating from Woodrow Wilson High School (where she was a teammate of T. J. Jordan), Whittington attended North Carolina State University where she became the fourth player in school history to score 1,000 points and grab 1,000 rebounds in her career. She was selected by Indiana in the second round (26th pick overall) of the 2008 WNBA Draft. Her hometown is Roanoke, Virginia.

She played for Montpellier in France during the 2008–09 WNBA off-season.

North  Carolina State statistics
Source

References

External links
WNBA.com: Khadijah Whittington Playerfile
N.C. State Profile

1986 births
Living people
African-American basketball players
American expatriate basketball people in France
American women's basketball players
Basketball players from Virginia
Indiana Fever draft picks
Indiana Fever players
NC State Wolfpack women's basketball players
Sportspeople from Portsmouth, Virginia
Sportspeople from Roanoke, Virginia
Small forwards
Woodrow Wilson High School (Portsmouth, Virginia) alumni